Colony Park may refer to:

 Colony Park, Pennsylvania
 Colony Park F.C., Scottish football club
 Mercury Colony Park, full-sized station wagon